"Young World" is a song written by Jerry Fuller and performed by Rick Nelson. It was released as a single in 1962 on Imperial Records.

Background
The personnel on "Young World" included The Wrecking Crew guitarist Glen Campbell and Nelson session regular James Burton on lead guitar. Joe Osborn played bass, with Ritchie Frost on drums and Jim Pierce on piano.

The song reached #5 on the Billboard Hot 100 singles chart. It also attained the #19 spot in the UK.

Cover versions
Arthur Alexander (album You Better Move On/1962).
James Darren (album Love Among the Young/1964)
Detlef Engel ("Isabella" German/1962)
Leif Garrett as the B-side to his 1977 single, "Come Back When You Grow Up".

References

1962 songs
1962 singles
Songs written by Jerry Fuller
Ricky Nelson songs
Leif Garrett songs
Imperial Records singles